A transition phase between the Darling Downs Institute of Advanced Education and the University of Southern Queensland, tertiary education facilities based at Darling Heights, Toowoomba, Queensland, Australia.

The UCSQ existed between 1990 and 1992.

Higher education in Australia